is a UK insolvency law case, concerning the definition of insolvency under the cash flow test.

Facts
Cheyne Finance plc had built a number of structured investment vehicles.

Judgment
Briggs J held that a court could take into account debts that would become payable in the near future, and perhaps further ahead, and whether paying those debts was likely.

See also
UK insolvency law

Notes

References

United Kingdom insolvency case law
2007 in case law
2007 in British law